Mike Freeman is an American jazz vibraphonist and composer from Omaha, Nebraska based in New York City's Hell's Kitchen neighborhood of Manhattan since 1981.

Early life and education 
Freeman started learning drums at age six and began playing professionally at age thirteen. At twelve, he began playing the vibraphone, and by fifteen, he was a percussionist for the Omaha Symphony Orchestra under conductor Thomas Briccetti. During his last year of high school, he began traveling to Chicago to study with renowned percussionist and veteran studio musician Bobby Christian. He graduated from DePaul University with a Bachelor of Music composition in 1981. In New York, he studied with composer and arranger Hale Rood.

Career 
Freeman has performed in North America, Europe, the Azores, Caribbean, and South America. In 1985, he did an extensive tour of Portugal, sponsored by the American Embassy and the Fulbright Foundation. The tour was arranged by Rui Martins, director of the Hot Club of Portugal, and USIA Cultural Affairs Officer Wally Keiderling. He performed in areas of the country rarely visited by American musicians and not previously visited by a vibraphone player. In Guarda, Portugal, he received the medal of the city.

His seven recordings of original music gained national and international attention and extensive radio airplay, charting on jazz, contemporary jazz, and world music radio as well as airing on syndicated radio programs.

A three time Lower Manhattan Cultural Council Creative Engagement grant recipient, Freeman produced Latin Music in Hell's Kitchen, A History 2019, Hell's Kitchen Soul Sauce 2021, and Boricua Blues 2022. At Manhattan Plaza he produced and organized benefit concerts for musicians affected by devastating hurricanes. He wrote a series, spanning more than a decade, of commissioned compositions and arrangements for the Chicago Symphony Orchestra's Percussion Scholarship Program and in 2014 was commissioned by drummer and educator Ed Uribe to write arrangements for China's national percussion curriculum that were performed by members of the Shanghai Symphony Orchestra at the Shanghai Symphony Hall.

Freeman is also known for performing and recording with several acclaimed Latin groups including percussionist Ray Mantilla from 2002 until Mantilla's passing in 2020. Good Vibrations on Savant Records was Jazzweek's top Latinjazz recording on radio in 2006. He performed and recorded with Jose Mangual Jr's Son Boricua featuring Jimmy Sabater (one of the architects of Boogaloo) from 2003 to present, with Julio Salgado from 2000 to present and with Lucho Cueto's all-star group Black Sugar. He also performed with the Spanish Harlem Orchestra (directed by Oscar Hernandez) at Madison Square Garden and with Willie Villegas's Joe Cuba Sextet both with legendary sonero Cheo Feliciano.

Discography

As leader 
 Mike Freeman ZonaVibe Venetian Blinds, VOF, 2018
 Mike Freeman ZonaVibe Blue Tjade, VOF, (Dec.) 2015
 Mike Freeman ZonaVibe The Vibesman, VOF, 2012 
 Mike Freeman ZonaVibe In The Zone, VOF, 2007 
 Mike Freeman Wiggle Stomp, VOF, 2000 
 Mike Freeman & Spellbound Street Shuffle, Best Recordings, 1991
 Mike Freeman & Spellbound, 1985

As featured side musician 
 Metropolitan Jazz Octet The Bowie Project, 2023, Origin Records
 Julio Salgado Mis Pasos, Tropique Recordings, 2021
 Ray Mantilla Rebirth, Savant Records, 2020
 Ray Mantilla High Voltage, Savant Records, 2017
 Luis Blasini All Natural, 2014 
 William Mendoza Latin Heartbeat Orchestra El Regreso, 2014 
 Los Hermanos Mangual Sabor y Swing, 2012
 Manny Padilla & Baya Allstars Para Mi Madre, 2011 
 Mark Holen Zambomba Three Gold Coins, 2009 
 Lucho Cueto's, Black Sugar Estamos Azucar, Latin Sound Records, 2007 
 Ray Mantilla Good Vibrations, Savant Records, 2006 
 Son Boricua Fabuloso 70's, Cobo Music, 2004 
 Mark Holen Zambomba Stretching The Truth, 1997 
 Damon Short Worry Later The Music of Monk, 1981

As session musician 
 Kirsten Thien, Delicious, Screen Door Records, 2010 
 Capathia Jenkins & Lou Rosen, South Side Stories, Rosecap Productions, 2006 
 Stephanie Pope, Now's the Time to Fall in Love, Jerome Records, 2001 
 The Manhattan Transfer, Swing, Atlantic records, 1997
 Don Sebesky, Foxwoods TV commercial, The Wonder of it All, featuring John Pizzarelli Jr., 1999
 As You Like It, Shakespeare Theater, Washington D.C., 1997
 Peer Gynt, Shakespeare Theater, Washington D.C., 1998
 Northeast Local, Lincoln Center Mitzi Newhouse Theater, NYC, 1996
 Titus Andronicus, Shakespeare-in-the-Park, NYC, 1989

References

External links 

 

1959 births
Living people
American jazz composers
American male jazz composers
American jazz vibraphonists
DePaul University alumni
Musicians from Omaha, Nebraska
Jazz musicians from Nebraska